'Abd al-Wahid ibn Zaid (Urdu عبد الواحد بن زید) also known as Abdul Wahid bin Zayd, has been quoted in Fazail-e-Sadaqat as great early sufi shiekh. He is also reported to have received education from Imam Abu Hanifah, before being initiated full-time as a Sufi by Khwaja Hasan al-Basri. His date of death is said to be on 27th of Safar, 177 AH (711 AD). His shrine is in Basrah, Iraq.

Biography
He is known by the titles of Shaykh al-Ubbad (Shaykh of servants of God) and Shaykh al-Sufiyya (Shaykh of the Sufis). He is famous for his legends about zuhd. It is rumored that he met Hasan-i Basri and that he was his student. Although Attar of Nishapur mentions Abdul Wahid to be a contemporary of Yusuf bin Husayn al-Razi (d. 304 AH/916 AD) and states that he repented in his assembly, this does not seem to be true.

Abdul Wahid is one of the "weeping ascetics" of Basra. It is reported in the sources that because of Malik bin Dinar's loud cry while listening to his sermon, the people next to him could not follow the sermon, passed out while crying, and those in his assembly fell into ecstasy in the same way. There were even those who died from ecstasy. Wazzan says that he felt plenty of sadness for all the people of Basra. It is rumored that he constantly talked about love and affection, that he is amongst a group that greatly emphasized love, that a community with this understanding had formed around him, and that he had proposed to Rabia al-Adawiyya. He says, "Love is the highest degree". However, he says that contentment (rida) is superior to that. Ibn Taymiyya says that Abdul Wahid said, referring to one of the prophets, "God is in love with me and I am in love with God" - a phrase usually attributed to Abu al-Husayn al-Nuri, and that the first sufi lodge (dergah) was founded by one of his disciples.

Abdul Wahid is mentioned in the chain of succession of the Alewiyya and Kummaliyya sufi orders (tariqas), has many words and legends attributed to him especially in al-Yafii's Rawd al-Rayahin, in the manaqib and in the Sufi tabaqat books. It has been claimed that he was from the Mu'tazila due to reasons such as his inclination to the view on kasb (earning) and his inability to reconcile the verse of the Quran "Allah (if He wills) misleads the servants" with Allah's omnipotence. Yet according to the sources, he also met with Amr bin Ubayd, one of the founders of Mutazila, and cut off ties with him due to his mutazilite views. He narrated hadiths from Hasan al-Basri and Ata bin Abu Rahab, and scholars such as Waqi', Ibn al-Sammak and Darani narrated from him. However, hadith critics consider him an abandoned narrator (matruk) and the hadiths he narrated as munkar.

See also
 Abu Sulayman al-Darani
 List of Sufis
 Chishti Order

References

Further reading

Salaf
Sunni Sufis
Muslim ascetics
Iraqi Sufi saints
8th-century people from the Abbasid Caliphate
8th-century people from the Umayyad Caliphate
793 deaths
Year of birth missing